Elizabeth Chesire (born 9 January 1950) is a Kenyan middle-distance runner. She competed in the women's 800 metres at the 1968 Summer Olympics.

References

1950 births
Living people
Athletes (track and field) at the 1968 Summer Olympics
Kenyan female middle-distance runners
Olympic athletes of Kenya
Place of birth missing (living people)